Aziz Nesin (born Mehmet Nusret, 20 December 1915 – 6 July 1995) was a Turkish writer, humorist and the author of more than 100 books. Born in a time when Turks did not have official surnames, he had to adopt one after the Surname Law of 1934 was passed. Although his family carried the epithet "Topalosmanoğlu", after an ancestor named "Topal Osman", he chose the surname "Nesin".

Pseudonyms
Generally going by the name "Aziz Nesin", the name "Aziz" was originally his father's nickname, used by Nesin for the pseudonym under which he started publishing. He wrote under more than fifty noms de plume, such as the pseudonym "Vedia Nesin", his first wife's name, which he used for love poems published in the magazine Yedigün.

Biography
He was born in 1917 on Heybeliada, one of the Princes' Islands of Istanbul, in the days of the Ottoman Empire. After serving as a career officer for several years, he became the editor of a series of satirical periodicals with a socialist slant. He was jailed several times and placed under surveillance by the National Security Service (MAH in Turkish) for his political views.

In 1946 Nesin launched a weekly satirical magazine, Marko Paşa, with two leading figures, namely Sabahattin Ali and Rıfat Ilgaz. Before that Nesin was a contributor to Tan newspaper.

Nesin provided a strong indictment of the oppression and brutalization of the common man. He satirized bureaucracy and "exposed economic inequities in stories that effectively combine local color and universal truths". Aziz Nesin has been presented with numerous awards in Turkey, Italy, Bulgaria and the former Soviet Union. His works have been translated into over thirty languages. During latter parts of his life he was said to be the only Turkish author who made a living only out of his earnings from his books.

On 6 June 1956, he married a coworker from the Akbaba magazine, Meral Çelen.

In 1972, he founded the Nesin Foundation in Catalca. The purpose of the Nesin Foundation is to take, each year, four poor and destitute children into the Foundation's home and provide every necessity - shelter, education and training, starting from elementary school - until they complete high school, a trade school, or until they acquire a vocation. Aziz Nesin donated to the Nesin Foundation his copyrights in their entirety for all his works in Turkey or other countries, including all of his published books, all plays to be staged, all copyrights for documentars, and all his works performed or used in radio or television.

Aziz Nesin was a political activist. In the aftermath of the 1980 military coup led by Kenan Evren, Turkish intelligentsia faced heavy oppression. Aziz Nesin led a number of intellectuals to rebel against the military government, by issuing the Petition of Intellectuals, notable signatories of which included Yalçın Küçük, Korkut Boratav, Atıf Yılmaz and Murat Belge. He was the two-time President of Türkiye Yazarlar Sendikası (Turkish Writers' Union) once from 1980 to 1986, and subsequently from 1987 to 1989.

He was also a critic of Islam. In the early 1990s, he began a translation of Salman Rushdie's controversial novel, The Satanic Verses. This provoked outrage from Islamic organizations, who were gaining popularity throughout Turkey, who then tried to hunt him down. On 11 July 1992, while attending a mostly Alevi cultural festival in the central Anatolian city of Sivas, a mob organized by Islamists gathered around the Madimak Hotel, where the festival attendants were accommodated. After hours of siege, the intruders set the hotel on fire. After flames engulfed several lower floors of the hotel, firetrucks managed to get close, and Aziz Nesin and many guests of the hotel escaped. However, 37 people were killed. This event, also known as the Sivas massacre, was perceived as censorship, and human rights in Turkey were allegedly disrupted at that time. It also deepened the rift between fundamentalist Muslims and those that they regard as infidels.

He devoted his last years to combating religious fundamentalism. Aziz Nesin died on 11 July 1999 in  Çeşme, İzmir, due to a heart attack. After his death, his body was buried at an unknown location in land belonging to the Nesin Foundation, without any ceremony, as requested in his will.

English language bibliography 
Several of Nesin's works have been published in English translation.

Istanbul Boy 
Istanbul Boy: The Autobiography of Aziz Nesin (Turkish title: Böyle Gelmiş Böyle Gitmez) is a multi-volume autobiography by Turkish writer Aziz Nesin published by University of Texas Press and Southmoor Studios, in English language translation by Joseph S. Jacobson.

Editions

Turkish Stories from Four Decades 
Turkish Stories from Four Decades is a 1991 short story collection by Turkish writer Aziz Nesin published by Three Continents Press, in English language translation by Louis Mitler.

Editions

Dog Tails 
Dog Tails is a long story collection by Turkish writer Aziz Nesin republished in 2000 by Southmoor Studios, in Spanish language translation by Joseph S. Jacobson.

Editions

Memoirs Of An Exile 
Memoirs Of An Exile (Turkish title: Bir Sürgünün Hatıraları) is an autobiographical memoir by Turkish writer Aziz Nesin about his exile to Bursa, republished in 2001 by Southmoor Studios, in English language translation by Joseph S. Jacobson.

Editions

Hayri the Barber Surnâmé 
Hayri the Barber Surnâmé (Turkish title: Surnâme) is a novel by Turkish writer Aziz Nesin republished in 2001 by Southmoor Studios, in English language translation by Joseph S. Jacobson.

Editions

Out of the Way! Socialism's Coming! 
Out of the Way! Socialism's Coming! (Turkish title: Sosyalizm Geliyor Savulun!) is a 2001 selection of three stories from a short story collection by Turkish writer Aziz Nesin, published by Milet Books, in a dual of the original Turkish and an English language translation by Damian Croft, as part of its series of Turkish-English Short Story Collections.

The publisher states that, "In these hilarious and entertaining stories, the legendary Aziz Nesin turns his uniquely incisive, satirical wit on shifting ideologies, bureaucracy and the question of who’s really (in)sane: the ones locked up or the ones outside."

A review in Write Away states that, "These are thought provoking parables of our time," that, "take the mickey out of bureaucracy and political ideology and hypocrisy," and "should leave readers laughing and thinking."

The volume consists of the stories;
Out of the Way! Socialism's Coming!
The Inspector's Coming
The Lunatics Break Loose

For an English-only edition of the full collection, see below under Socialism Is Coming: Stand Aside.

Editions

The Dance of the Eagle and the Fish 
The Dance of the Eagle and the Fish is a children's book adapted by English writer Alison Boyle from the short story of the same name by Turkish writer Aziz Nesin and published in 2001 by Milet Books, in English language translation by Ruth Christie.

Editions

Socialism Is Coming: Stand Aside 
Socialism Is Coming: Stand Aside (Turkish title: Sosyalizm Geliyor Savulun!) is a short story collection by Turkish writer Aziz Nesin republished in 2002 by Southmoor Studios, in English language translation by Joseph S. Jacobson.

Editions

The Tales of Nasrettin Hoca 
The Tales of Nasrettin Hoca (Turkish title: Nasrettin Hoca Hikayeleri) is a short story collection by Turkish writer Aziz Nesin based on the folk tales of Nasrettin Hoca republished in 2002 by Dost Yayınları, in English language translation by Talât Sait Halman.

Editions

Laugh or Lament 
Laugh or Lament: Selected Short Stories is a 2002 short story collection by Turkish writer Aziz Nesin published by Turkish Ministry of Culture, in English language translation by Masud Akhtar Shaikh, with an introduction by the translator.

The volume consists of the stories;

Editions

Online translations 
[https://web.archive.org/web/20090217150107/http://menic.utexas.edu/istanbul_boy/ Istanbul Boy: The Autobiography of Aziz Nesin, Part I] at University of Texas.
A Patriotic Duty at Boğaziçi University.

Notes
 According to Nesin's autobiography Memoirs of an Exile: "They named me Nusret. In Turkish, this Arabic word means 'God's Help.' It was a name entirely fitting to us because my family, destitute of any other hope, placed all their hope in God."

References

Sources
 Nesin, Aziz. Istanbul Boy – The autobiography of Aziz Nesin, translated by Joseph S. Jacobson
 Turkishculture.org – Aziz Nesin (1916-1995)
 Allword, Edward. The Tatars of Crimea: Return to the Homeland : Studies and Documents''. North Carolina: Duke University Press, 1998. .

External links
 Nesin Foundation 
 Turkish Culture
  &  
 Poems of Aziz Nesin Poetry of Aziz Nesin, translated into English
 Online edition of Istanbul Boy, Part I
 Aziz Nesin: A Black-comedy Defiant Turkish Satirist
 

1915 births
1995 deaths
Turkish atheism activists
Writers from Istanbul
Turkish people of Crimean Tatar descent
Kuleli Military High School alumni
Turkish Military Academy alumni
Turkish Army officers
Turkish children's writers
Turkish magazine founders
Turkish novelists
Turkish poets
Turkish former Muslims
Turkish prisoners and detainees
Turkish humorists
Prisoners and detainees of Turkey
20th-century novelists
20th-century poets
Akbaba (periodical) people
Turkish secularists
Turkish Marxists
Turkish atheists
Former Muslims turned agnostics or atheists